Five is a 2011 American comedy-drama anthology television film which premiered on Lifetime on October 10, 2011. The film drew 1.3 million viewers to its premiere. A sequel, Call Me Crazy: A Five Film, was released in 2013.

Plot
An anthology of five short films exploring the impact of breast cancer on people's lives.

Cast and crew

Segment Mia
 Patricia Clarkson as Mia Newells
 Tony Shalhoub as Mitch Taylor
 Kathy Najimy as Rocky
 Romy Rosemont as Lynne
 Andrea Bendewald as Kate
Directed by Jennifer Aniston, written by Wendy West

Segment Pearl
 Jeanne Tripplehorn as Dr. Pearl Jarente
 Bob Newhart as Dr. Roth
 Alan Ruck as Sam Jarente
 Jeffrey Tambor as Danny Dinlear
 Scott Wilson as old Bill
 Talyan Wright as Charlotte age 6 / Sophia Beliaev as Charlotte age 11
Directed by Patty Jenkins, written by Deirdre O'Connor

Segment Lili
 Rosario Dawson as Lili
 Jenifer Lewis as Maggie
 Tracee Ellis Ross as Alyssa
Directed by Alicia Keys, written by Jill Gordon

Segment Charlotte
 Ginnifer Goodwin as Charlotte
 Ava Acres as young Pearl
 Josh Holloway as Bill
 Carla Gallo as Laura
 Aisha Hinds as Bernice
 Jennifer Morrison as Sheila
 Austin Nichols as Edward
 Annie Potts as Helen (Charlotte's Mom)
Directed by Demi Moore, written by Stephen Godchaux

Segment Cheyanne
 Lyndsy Fonseca as Cheyanne
 Taylor Kinney as Tommy
Directed by Penelope Spheeris, written by Howard Morris

Awards and nominations

References

External links
 
 

2011 television films
2011 films
2011 comedy-drama films
American anthology films
American comedy-drama television films
Films about cancer
Films directed by Patty Jenkins
Films directed by Penelope Spheeris
Films scored by Lorne Balfe
Lifetime (TV network) films
Jennifer Aniston
2010s English-language films
2010s American films
Films directed by Demi Moore